Team Coop–Hitec Products (UCI Code: HPU) is a professional women's cycling team based in Norway that competes in elite road bicycle racing events.

It is sponsored by Coop Norge, a Norwegian cooperative with head office in Oslo, and Hitec Products, a Norwegian owned company with head office in Stavanger. The company develops and delivers control systems, electro-hydraulic systems and chemical injection systems to the international energy industry.

Team history

2013

Riders in
On 14 August 2013 it was announced that South African National time trial and road race champion Ashleigh Moolman would be joining the team from Lotto–Belisol Ladies.

2014

Riders in
On September 1 Cyclingnews.com reported that Kirsten Wild would leave  and join the team for the 2015 season on a 2-year contract and later in the same month Vita Heine Petersone joined the team for the following season. On 27 October the team signed Tatiana Guderzo, with Thea Thorsen and Cecile Gotaas Johnsen signing contract extensions.

2021
In March 2021, the women's Team Hitec Products merged with the men's Team Coop for form the current team.

Team roster

Major wins

2011
Omloop Het Nieuwsblad, Emma Johansson
Omloop van het Hageland, Emma Johansson
Cholet Pays de Loire Dames, Emma Johansson
Grand Prix de Dottignies, Emma Johansson
Stage 3b Iurreta-Emakumeen Bira, Emma Johansson
Giro del Trentino Alto Adige-Südtirol, Emma Johansson
 Overall Thüringen Rundfahrt der Frauen, Emma Johansson
Stage 2, Emma Johansson
Stage 5 Trophée d'Or Féminin, Emilie Moberg
Stage 6 Trophée d'Or Féminin, Emma Johansson
Stage 2 Tour Cycliste Féminin International de l'Ardèche, Emilie Moberg
2012
 Overall Tour of Zhoushan Island, Emilie Moberg
Stage 1, Emilie Moberg
 Overall Tour de Free State, Emma Johansson
Stage 3, Emma Johansson
 Youth classification Giro d'Italia Femminile, Elisa Longo Borghini
Stage 9, Emma Johansson
 Mountains classification Thüringen Rundfahrt der Frauen, Elisa Longo Borghini
 Youth classification, Elisa Longo Borghini
Prologue & Stage 1 Tour Cycliste Féminin International de l'Ardèche, Cecilie Gotaas Johnsen
2013
Stage 1 Ladies Tour of Qatar, Chloe Hosking
Trofeo Alfredo Binda-Comune di Cittiglio, Elisa Longo Borghini
 Points classification, Tour of Chongming Island, Chloe Hosking
 Points classification Tour of Zhoushan Island, Cecilie Gotaas Johnsen
 Mountains classification, Cecilie Gotaas Johnsen
Stages 2 & 3, Cecilie Gotaas Johnsen
 Mountains classification Emakumeen Euskal Bira, Elisa Longo Borghini
Stage 4, Elisa Longo Borghini
2014
EPZ Omloop van Borsele (Road Race), Chloe Hosking
Grand Prix de Plumelec-Morbihan Dames, Audrey Cordon
 Italian rider classification Giro d'Italia Femminile, Elisa Longo Borghini
 Overall Tour de Bretagne Féminin, Elisa Longo Borghini
 Points classification, Audrey Cordon
  Mountains classification, Elisa Longo Borghini
Teams classification
Prologue & Stage 3, Elisa Longo Borghini
Stage 4, Audrey Cordon
 Overall Trophée d'Or Féminin, Elisa Longo Borghini
 Mountains classification, Elisa Longo Borghini
Stage 4, Elisa Longo Borghini
 Young riders classification Holland Ladies Tour, Elisa Longo Borghini
Stage 3 Belgium Tour, Chloe Hosking
2015
Novilon Eurocup, Kirsten Wild
Stage 2 The Princess Maha Chackri Sirindhon's Cup, Lauren Kitchen
Stage 3 Energiewacht Tour, Kirsten Wild
Ronde van Gelderland, Kirsten Wild
EPZ Omloop van Borsele, Kirsten Wild
Ronde van Overijssel Women, Lauren Kitchen
 Tour of Chongming Island, Kirsten Wild
Stages 1 & 2, Kirsten Wild
 Overall Tour of Zhoushan Island, Lauren Kitchen
Stage 1, Tatiana Guderzo
Stage 2, Lauren Kitchen
Grand Prix Cycliste de Gatineau, Kirsten Wild
Omloop van de IJsseldelta, Kirsten Wild
Stages 2 & 4 Tour de Feminin-O cenu Českého Švýcarska, Emilie Moberg
Stage 4 Tour de Bretagne Féminin, Kirsten Wild
2016
 Points classification Ladies Tour of Qatar, Kirsten Wild
Stage 1, Kirsten Wild
Stages 4a & 5 Energiewacht Tour, Kirsten Wild
Women's Tour de Yorkshire, Kirsten Wild
 Overall NEA, Vita Heine
Stages 1 (ITT) & 2, Vita Heine
Stage 4 Tour of California, Kirsten Wild
Prudential RideLondon Grand Prix, Kirsten Wild
KZN Summer Series Race 1, Vita Heine
KZN Summer Series Race 2, Vita Heine
2017
 Youth classification Tour of Thailand, Miriam Bjørnsrud
Stage 5 Healthy Ageing Tour, Emilie Moberg
 Overall Tour of Zhoushan Island, Charlotte Becker
 Points classification, Emilie Moberg
Teams classification
Stages 1 & 3, Emilie Moberg
Stage 2, Charlotte Becker
Diamond Tour, Nina Kessler
 Norwegian rider classification Ladies Tour of Norway, Susanne Andersen
2018
 Overall Tour of Chongming Island, Charlotte Becker
Stage 2, Charlotte Becker
Team classification Tour of Zhoushan Island
Stage 2, Charlotte Becker
Jaeren Sykkelfestival – Sandnes, Line Marie Gulliksen
Sandnes, Ingrid Moe
Erondegemse Pijl, Nina Kessler
2019
Stage 3 Tour of Uppsala, Vita Heine
Stage 3 Thüringen Rundfahrt der Frauen, Vita Heine
Omloop van de IJsseldelta, Marta Tagliaferro
 Overall Tour de Feminin-O cenu Českého Švýcarska, Vita Heine
Stage 1, Marta Tagliaferro
Stage 3a, Vita Heine
Chrono Champenois, Vita Heine
2020
Stage 1 Dubai Women's Tour, Lucy van der Haar
2022
 Frisian rider classification Bloeizone Fryslân Tour, Nicole Steigenga

National and continental champions

2010
 Norway Road Race, Lise Hafsø Nøstvold
2011
 Sweden Road Race, Emma Johansson
 Norway Road Race, Frøydis Wærsted
2012
 Sweden Time Trial, Emma Johansson
 Sweden Road Race, Emma Johansson
 Norway Time Trial, Lise Nøstvold 
 Norway Criterium, Emilie Møberg 
2013
 Sweden Road Race, Emilia Fahlin
 Norway Road Race, Cecilie Gotaas Johnsen
2014
 South Africa Time Trial, Ashleigh Moolman
 South Africa Road Race, Ashleigh Moolman
 Italy Time Trial, Elisa Longo Borghini
 Denmark Time Trial, Julie Leth
 Sweden Criterium, Sara Olsson
2015
 Oceania Road Race, Lauren Kitchen
 Norway Time Trial, Cecilie Gotaas Johnsen
 Norway Road Race, Miriam Bjørnsrud
 Netherlands Track (Madison), Kirsten Wild
 Netherlands Track (Individual pursuit), Kirsten Wild
2016
 Italy Track (Scratch race), Simona Frapporti
 Norway Junior Road Race,  Susanne Andersen
 Norway Time Trial, Vita Heine
 Norway Junior Time Trial, Susanne Andersen
 German Track (Points race), Charlotte Becker
 European Track (Elimination race), Kirsten Wild
 European Track (Team pursuit), Tatiana Guderzo
 European Track (Team pursuit), Simona Frapporti
 European Track (Points race), Kirsten Wild
 Netherlands Track (Madison), Kirsten Wild
 Netherlands Track (Individual pursuit), Kirsten Wild
 Netherlands Track (Scratch race), Kirsten Wild
 Netherlands Track (Points race), Kirsten Wild
 Italy Track (Individual pursuit), Simona Frapporti
2017
 Norway Time Trial, Vita Heine
 Norway Road Race, Vita Heine
 German Track (Omnium), Charlotte Becker
 Netherlands Track (Madison), Nina Kessler
2018
 Norway Time Trial, Line Marie Gulliksen
 Norway Criterium, Susanne Andersen
 Norway Road Race, Vita Heine
 German Track (Scratch race), Charlotte Becker
 German Track (Points race), Charlotte Becker
 German Track (Team pursuit), Charlotte Becker
 Norway Cyclo-cross, Ingrid Moe
2019
 Norway Criterium, Ingvild Gaaskjenn
 Norway Time Trial, Vita Heine
 Norway Road Race, Ingrid Lorvik 
2020
 European Team Time Trial, Mieke Kröger
2021
 Olympic Games Track (Team pursuit), Mieke Kröger
 World Mixed team relay, Mieke Kröger
 UEC European Track (Team pursuit), Mieke Kröger
 World Track (Team pursuit), Mieke Kröger
 Norway Track (Individual pursuit), Nora Tveit
 Norway Track (500m time trial), Nora Tveit
2022
 Norway Time Trial, Ane Iversen

References

External links

Cycling teams based in Norway
UCI Women's Teams
Cycling teams established in 2009